Take Me to Your Heaven is the debut album by Stevie Woods, released in 1981 on Cotillion Records. The album was reissued in 2010 by Wounded Bird Records.

The album is Woods' only album to chart on the Billboard 200 and Top Soul Albums charts. "Steal the Night" and "Just Can't Win 'Em All" are the album's (and Woods' only) Top 40 and Top 20 entries on the Billboard Hot 100 and Adult Contemporary charts respectively.

Track listing

Personnel
Production
Producer: Jack White
Engineer: David Clark, Jürgen Koppers, Steven D. Smith

Charts
Album

Singles

References

External links

1981 debut albums
albums arranged by Gene Page
Cotillion Records albums